Australia won the 1930 Ashes series against England, winning two of the matches and losing one, with the other two tests drawn. The Australian tourists were captained by Bill Woodfull, while the home side were led by Percy Chapman, who was dropped in favour of Bob Wyatt in the final Test.

Test series summary

First Test

Second Test

Third Test

Fourth Test

Fifth Test

1930 Australian Team Ashes warm-up
Before touring England for the 1930 Ashes Tour, the Australian team led by Bill Woodfull headed to Tasmania to play two first-class matches against Tasmania. The first match was played at the NTCA Ground before the teams moved on to Hobart. Hobart paper The Mercury said:

After leaving Port Melbourne on ship the Nairana, the Australians arrived in Launceston via the Tamar River at 9am on 8 March 1930, as "a big crowd waited to greet the tourists". Later that day, they started their match against a Tasmanian team that included Laurie Nash. The hosts won the toss and batted in "perfect weather", despite being bowled out for 157. Fast-bowler, Alan Fairfax was the main destroyer, taking 4 for 36 (4/36) in 13 overs. Only wicket-keeping opener James Atkinson scored a half-century, as Tasmania collapsed from 1/50. The Australians began their reply positively, with Bill Ponsford and Stan McCabe taking the score to 120 without loss. After Ponsford was dismissed on 36, Alan Kippax and McCabe saw out the final overs of the day, with McCabe finishing not out on 93 and Kippax undefeated on eight.

The next day, The Australians went fishing at the Great Lake, south of Launceston, before resuming the match on Monday. After McCabe scored his century, Australia stumbled to 3/163, bringing Bradman to the crease. In Nash's second over, he trapped Bradman leg before wicket for just 20 scored in 24 minutes. The Australian were eventually bowled out for 311, despite Gerald James taking 5/97 in 22 overs. Although Nash got the wicket of Bradman, the batsmen attacked him, taking 1/82 in 13 overs. By the end of the days play, Tasmania were already under pressure at 6/109.

The next day saw Tasmania bowled out for 158, as Nash was the only batsman to offer any resistance with 49. The Australians were eventual victors by ten wickets. They won the following match in Hobart, before regaining the Ashes 2–1.

The Australians had a stopover in Colombo en route to England and played a one-day single-innings match there against the Ceylon national team, which at that time did not have Test status.

See also
 That's Cricket, a 1931 Australian featurette

Notes

References

Further reading
 Wisden Cricketers' Almanack 1931
 Bill Frindall, The Wisden Book of Test Cricket 1877-1978, Wisden, 1979
 Chris Harte, A History of Australian Cricket, Andre Deutsch, 1993

External links
 Australia in England: May/Aug 1930 at Cricinfo
 Australia in British Isles 1930 at CricketArchive

1930 in Australian cricket
1930 in English cricket
1930 in Ceylon
1930
1930
International cricket competitions from 1918–19 to 1945
Sri Lankan cricket seasons from 1880–81 to 1971–72
1930